The Holden Salisbury Differential is an automobile axle manufactured by Holden at its Melbourne plant, alongside the weaker Holden Banjo Differential, introduced in 1948, installed in Holden's debut model, the Holden 48-215, all the way through until production of the VL Commodore ceased in 1988. The Salisbury assembly is similar to that or your average passenger car, the Banjo on the other hand shared an assembly similar to that of the Ford 9-inch axle.

The Differential was named after the Adelaide suburb of Salisbury, South Australia.

Ratios
2.60:1 (Salisbury only)
2.78:1
3.08:1
3.36:1
3.55:1
3.90:1 (Banjo only)
4.44:1 (Salisbury only)

Axles
Coarse spline
28 spline
31 spline

Stud patterns
5x4.25" (48-HG, Brougham, HK-HG Monaro & Torana)
5x4.75" (HQ-WB, Statesman, HQ-HZ Monaro & Torana A9X & L34)
5x120 (VB-VL Commodore)

Applications
1948-1968 Holden Standard
1953-1968 Holden Special
1962-1980 Holden Premier
1968-1977 Holden Belmont
1968-1980 Holden Kingswood
1968-1971 Holden Brougham
1968-1976 Holden Monaro
1969-1982 Holden Torana
1971-1984 Holden One Tonner
1971-1984 Statesman
1972 Holden SS (based upon the HQ Belmont V8)
1974-1980 Holden Sandman (based upon Belmont and Kingswood Models)
1979-1988 Holden Commodore

See also
 10.5" Corporate 14 Bolt Differential
 Ford 9-inch axle

References

Automobile axles